Communications in the United States Virgin Islands

The following statistics are from the CIA World Factbook, unless otherwise indicated.

Telephone
Telephones - main lines in use: 74,200 (2008) The traditional wire line provider in the United States Virgin Islands is Viya. Viya is a subsidiary of ATN International

Telephones - mobile cellular: 80,300 (2005)

The islands are served by Viya, Claro Puerto Rico, and T-Mobile US.

Telephone system:
general assessment: modern system with total digital switching, uses fiber-optic cable and microwave radio relay
domestic: full range of services available
international: submarine cable connections to US, the Caribbean, Central and South America;; satellite earth stations - NA

Country code / area code +1-340

Radio
Radio broadcast stations:
24 radio stations broadcasting (2009)

Radios:
107,000 (2003)

Television
Television broadcast stations:
about a dozen television broadcast stations including 1 public TV station; multi-channel cable and satellite TV services are available (2009)

Televisions:
68,000 (1997)

Internet
The U.S. Virgin Islands' country code top-level domain is .vi.

Internet hosts: 8,933 (2010)

Internet users: 30,000 (2008)

Locally owned and operated Internet Service Provider: SM@RTNET www.smartnet.vi
Providing Internet service via fixed wireless and Fiber Optics.

See also

Internet in the United States Virgin Islands
Internet in the United States
.us

References

External links
 U.S. Virgin Islands Public Services Commission - Telecommunications Sector
 U.S. Virgin Islands, SubmarineCableMap.com

United States Virgin Islands
 
United States Virgin Islands
Telecommunications in the United States